Veopallan is a mountain in Lom Municipality in Innlandet county, Norway. The mountain is surrounded by several other notable mountains including Veotinden to the south, Styggehøi and Vestre Hestlægerhøe to the southeast, Austre Hestlægerhøe and Nautgardstinden to the east, Glittertinden and Steinbukampen to the north, Galdhøpiggen to the west, and Veobreahesten to the southwest.

See also
List of mountains of Norway

References

Jotunheimen
Lom, Norway
Mountains of Innlandet